The Madison Farm Historic and Archeological District is a complex of historic and prehistoric Native American and colonial sites in rural Montgomery County, Virginia. Its historic artifacts include a surviving hall-parlor log house, probably built late in the 18th century by William Madison, which is one of the few of its type to survive in the county. The building was substantially modified in the 19th century, refinishing the interior and adding a two-story porch. The farm site includes a number of historic  outbuildings (or remnants of same), and is a good prospect for archaeological investigation into period farming practices.

The farm is also the site of two prehistoric Native American sites.  One, designated 44MY37 and known as the Marye Site, is a significant Late Woodland Period village site, at which evidence of Archaic period occupation has also been found.  Investigation of this site is believed to be important in yielding further understanding of Native American life in the area.

The district was listed on the National Register of Historic Places in 1991.

See also
National Register of Historic Places listings in Montgomery County, Virginia

References

National Register of Historic Places in Montgomery County, Virginia
Archaeological sites on the National Register of Historic Places in Virginia
Elliston, Virginia
Historic districts on the National Register of Historic Places in Virginia